The individual dressage competition of the equestrian events at the 2011 Pan American Games took place between October 16–19 at the Guadalajara Country Club and the Hipica Club.  The defending Pan American champion was Christopher Hickey of the United States of America.

The first round of the individual dressage competition is the  FEI Prix St. Georges Test. The Prix St. Georges Test consists of a battery of required movements that each rider and horse pair performs. Five judges evaluate the pair, giving marks between 0 and 10 for each element. The judges' scores were averaged to give a final score for the pair.

The top 25 individual competitors in that round advance to the individual-only competitions, though each nation was limited to three pairs advancing. This second round consisted of an Intermediare I Test, which is a higher degree of difficulty. The 15 best pairs in the Intermediare I Test advanced to the final round. That round consists of, the Intermediare I Freestyle Test, competitors designed their own choreography set to music. Judges in that round evaluated the artistic merit of the performance and music as well as the technical aspects of the dressage. Final scores were based on the average of the Freestyle and Intermediare I Test results.

Schedule
All times are Central Standard Time (UTC-6).

Results

Qualification

Final rounds

References

Equestrian at the 2011 Pan American Games